Italy competed at the 1999 World Championships in Athletics in Sevilla, Spain from 20 to 29 August 1999.

Medalists

Finalists
The largest team ranked 9th (with 13 finalists) in the IAAF placing table. Rank obtained by assigning eight points in the first place and so on to the eight finalists.

Results
Italy participated with 66 athletes by winning three medals.

Men (30)

Women (13)

References

External links
 The “Azzurri” at the World Championships (from 1983 to 2009)

Nations at the 1999 World Championships in Athletics
World Championships in Athletics
Italy at the World Championships in Athletics